Katanga Slum is a settlement located in the valley between Mulago Hospital and Makerere University, in Uganda's capital city, Kampala.

Location
Katanga slum is located in Kawempe Division. It is bordered by Bwaise to the north, Mulago to the east, Wandegeya to the west, and Nakasero to the south.

Overview
Katanga slum stretches about 1.5 kilometres from Wandegeya to Kubiri, near Bwaise. Katanga is divided into two administrative Local Council 1 zone, "Busia zone" and "Kimwanyi zone". It is developed with students hostels as viewed from Wandegeya, and temporary structures built with timber or mud and bricks. The temporary structures are mostly close to Mulago hospital.

References

External links 
"Katanga Slum Evictees Return to the Disputed Land"
"Makerere razes Katanga buildings"
"Fighting for respect – women’s boxing in the slums of Kampala"

Neighborhoods of Kampala
Kumusha
Kawempe Division